Kyang  is a village development committee in Parbat District in the Dhawalagiri Zone of central Nepal. At the time of the 1991 Nepal census it had a population of 2279 people living in 443 individual households. Kyang is one of the best touristic destination of Parbat district. The hill of Haljure situated at around 2465m altitude is one of the best view point of Parbat.

References

External links
UN map of the municipalities of Parbat District

Populated places in Parbat District